Baron Stow (1801–1869) was a Boston Baptist minister, writer and editor, who in 1843 with Samuel Francis Smith compiled a Baptist hymnal entitled: The Psalmist, which for the next thirty years was the most widely used Baptist Hymnal in the United States.

Early life and education
Baron Stow was born June 16, 1801, in Croydon, New Hampshire and graduated in 1825 from Columbian College, now George Washington University in Washington, D.C.

Ordained ministry
In 1827 Baron Stow was ordained a minister in a Baptist church in Portsmouth, New Hampshire. He left there in 1832 to become pastor of the Baldwin Street Baptist Church in Boston. After 16 years, he left to become pastor of the Rowe Street Baptist Church, from which he retired in 1867.

He married community activists Thomas Dalton and Lucy Lew Francis on June 5, 1834 at the Rowe Street Baptist Church in Boston.

Death
Baron Stow died December 27, 1869, in Boston.

Bibliography

 Baron Stow (1864). " Early History of Our Missionary Organization, with Biographical Sketches of the Founders," in The Missionary Jubilee: An Account of the Fiftieth Anniversary of the American Baptist Missionary Union, at Philadelphia, May 24, 25, and 26, 1864, with Commemorative Papers and Discourses, (New York: Sheldon & Company, 1869): 89–138.

References

External links
Stockbridge, John Calvin.  "The Model Pastor: A Memoir of the Life and Correspondence of Rev. Baron Stow".  Boston: Lee and Shepard, 1871.

1801 births
1869 deaths
American religious leaders
Baptist ministers from the United States
Editors of Christian publications
American evangelicals
Baptist writers
Columbian College of Arts and Sciences alumni
People from Croydon, New Hampshire
People from Boston
19th-century American clergy